Kang Hee-gun (born February 24, 1978), better known by his stage name Gary (often spelled as Garie), is a South Korean rapper, songwriter, record producer, entrepreneur, and television personality. Besides being a solo artist, he is also the rapper and lyricist of the former hip hop duo Leessang. Since their formation in 2002, the group has produced a total of eight albums and had several hits under their belt. In 2014, Gary made his debut as a solo artist with the mini-album Mr.Gae. Despite the album being banned by all major TV broadcast stations for its 19+ content, his songs still managed to top several charts. He and long time collaborator Jung-in later went on to form the duo, Jung In & Gary. The two released the singles "Your Scent" and "Bicycle."

Aside from his own work, Gary has been featured in works by famous artists such as Psy, Baek Ji-young, Lee Hyori, Dynamic Duo, and MC Mong. He is also a former cast member of the variety show Running Man.

Early life

Gary was born on February 24, 1978. His nickname in middle school was "Gae" (meaning "dog" in Korean), which he adapted to become his stage name, after deciding between "gaemi" (ant) and "Gary".  In his younger years, he was more interested in dancing than rapping. Gary revealed that he participated in a dance competition and actually won, defeating other competitors, Jang Woo Hyuk and Moon Hee Jun, who eventually became members of H.O.T. Lee Soo Man scouted all three boys, and offered them a contract to SM Entertainment. Ultimately, Gary rejected the offer. Gary went to Yong In University and trained as a bodyguard. He was an amateur boxer for 10 years.

Musical and film career

1997–2001: X-Teen and Honey Family 
In 1997, Gary joined X-Teen, a hip-hop group where he met his future Leessang partner, Gil. Gary participated in the group's album release in 1998 before being dropped along with Gil. In an interview, Gary said they had neither the look or the talent which made them quit the group.

Afterwards, Gary and Gil ended up joining "Honey Family" and released two albums in 1999 and 2000. Gary took part of the responsibility for the break up of the group by  stating that he "started feeling like a celebrity" after their initial success. Gary, Gil, and fellow Honey Family member Diggity decided to form "Leessam Trio" ("sam" means "three" in Korean). They released a compilation album called 2000 Korea, in the year 2000. When Diggity left the group, Gary and Gil changed the name to LeeSsang.

2002–2017: Leessang

Leessang was created in 2002 by Gary and Gil. So far, the group has produced eight albums with numerous hits. Although the duo achieve critical success from their earlier albums, they remained underground. Their last three albums, Hexagonal, Asura Balbalta, and Unplugged broke numerous records and guided their entry to the mainstream Korean music industry. The title song from Asura Balbalta, "Turn Off the TV" managed to stay at the top of the Melon chart for 25 days in a row.

2010-2017: Running Man
In 2010, Gary joined Running Man, an urban variety show, as a co-host, along with 6 other original cast members, including Yoo Jae-suk, Haha, Ji Suk-jin, Kim Jong-kook, Lee Kwang-soo and Song Joong-ki while the only female member, Song Ji-hyo, joined the cast a few episodes afterward. The popularity of Running Man helped Gary and the rest of the cast gain international recognition.

In October 2016, the producers of Running Man announced the departure of Gary, who wanted to focus on his music career after being a regular member for nearly 7 years. His last filming with the main cast was for episode 324. However, he made a brief return in the following episode 325 as a guest.

In January 2017, Gary appeared for Member's Week on episode 336.

2014–present: Solo career
In January 2014, he released a mini album, Mr.Gae. Three major TV broadcast stations, MBC, KBS, and SBS, all deemed the album unfitting for broadcast, stating reasons such as explicit lyrics and being too sexually provocative. Despite the ban, Gary's title track “Shower Later” clenched the number 1 spot on 8 real-time music charts.

Gary later commented on the ban saying that he felt confined by his image and wanted to break the mold.

In May 2014, Gary and Jung-in released their first collaboration "Your Scent." The lyrics was penned by Gary while Jung-In and Duble Sidekick produced the music. Despite not having any live promotions, Gary and Jung-In took the win on June 7 Music Core. In a testament to its popularity, the Gaon Chart ranked the single #6 on the year end national digital single ranking. The two later released their second collaboration "Bicycle" in September 2014.

In September 2015, Gary released his second solo album, 2002. The title track of the album is "Get Some Air" featuring Mi-woo of Leessang Company. Several other tracks in this album also featured Koonta, Deepflow, Skull, Jay Park, DJ Pumkin, Park Myung-ho Double K, Don Mills, Jung-in, John Park and Young-jun of Brown Eyed Souls.

In January 2016, Gary released a single, "Lonely Night" featuring Gaeko of Dynamic Duo. A music video was released on the same day, featuring actress and fellow castmate of Running Man, Song Ji-hyo. Gary was nominated as a no.1 candidate on SBS Inkigayo on January 10, 2016, and subsequently won the award.

On January 6, 2020, KBS announced that Gary would be joining the cast of The Return of Superman after a three-year broadcasting hiatus. Gary and his family appeared on the show until their departure in December.

In March 2020, Million Market revealed that they had signed a non-exclusive contract with Gary through his agency Double 8. Contract negotiations were concluded when Gary joined as a cast member of The Return of Superman.

Personal life
On April 5, 2017, Gary revealed on his social media account that he had married a non-celebrity woman known as "Miss Kim" who worked at Gary's company named 'Leessang' for 5 years before their marriage. Their first child, a son named Kang Ha-oh was born on October 15, 2017.

Filmography

Film

Television series

Variety shows

Discography

Studio albums

Extended plays

Singles

Soundtrack appearances

Featuring

Awards and nominations

References

External links

 

1978 births
Living people
Jungle Entertainment artists
Leessang members
Music promoters
South Korean chief executives
South Korean hip hop record producers
South Korean hip hop singers
South Korean male rappers
South Korean music industry executives
South Korean television personalities
Yong In University alumni
20th-century South Korean male singers
21st-century South Korean male singers
South Korean male singer-songwriters